The 2000 Oceania Athletics Championships were held at the Santos Stadium in Adelaide, Australia, between August 24–26, 2000.

A total of 40 events were contested, 21 by men and 19 by women.

In preparation for the 2000 Summer Olympics in Sydney, athletes from 10 African countries participated as guests.

Medal summary
Medal winners were published.  Complete results can be found on the webpages of the Cool Running New Zealand newsgroup.

Men

Women

Medal table (unofficial)

Participation (unofficial)
The participation of athletes from 19 countries and 10 guest countries from
Africa was reported.  In addition, a couple of Australian athletes started as
guests out of competition.

 
 
 
 
 
 
 
 

 
 
 
 
 
 
 
/
 
 

African guest countries:

References

Oceania Athletics Championships
International athletics competitions hosted by Australia
Oceanian Championships
2000 in Australian sport
August 2000 sports events in Australia